Ulalushka (Ulaluşka) is a rural locality (a settlement) in Mayminsky District, the Altai Republic, Russia. The population was 9 as of 2016.

Geography 
Ulalushka is located 20 km southeast of Mayma (the district's administrative centre) by road. Alfyorovo is the nearest rural locality.

References 

Rural localities in Mayminsky District